Benz Vasu is a 1980 Indian Malayalam film,  directed and produced by Hassan. The film stars Jayan, Pattom Sadan, Sankaradi and Sreelatha Namboothiri in the lead roles. The film has musical score by A. T. Ummer.

Plot 
Vasu (Jayan) is a petty criminal who inherits a small garage from his friend Varkey (Balan K. Nair). His efforts turn it into a profitable business and he's now a prominent businessman referred to as Benz Vasu.He's still traumatized by the murder of his adulterous mother by the hand of his father. However he begins to change his mind as he runs across Malathi (Seema), a poor girl. When he realises that Malathi is in fact in love with Madhu (Sathar) one of his own employees, Vasu makes plans to separate the couple and win Malathi for himself. However it turns out to be fruitless and Madhu and Malathi marry each other. Meanwhile Madhu is not popular with the other employees as he stops them fleecing their boss, Vasu. The employees plan to murder Madhu without Vasu's knowledge.

Cast

Jayan as Vasu
Seema as Malathi
Pattom Sadan
Sankaradi as Raghavan
Sreelatha Namboothiri as Stella
Cochin Haneefa as Thoma
Paul Vengola
Prathapachandran as Vasu's Father
Sathaar as Madhu
Balan K. Nair as Varkey
Kuthiravattam Pappu as Pappu
Priya
Raji
Vanchiyoor Radha

Soundtrack
The music was composed by A. T. Ummer and the lyrics were written by B. Manikyam.

References

External links
 

1980 films
1980s Malayalam-language films
Films scored by A. T. Ummer